The Slovak National Uprising (abbreviated SNP) was a military uprising organized by the Slovak resistance movement during World War II in central Slovakia. This resistance movement was represented mainly by the members of the Democratic Party, but also by social democrats and Communists, albeit on a smaller scale. It was launched on 29 August 1944 from Banská Bystrica in an attempt to resist German troops that had occupied Slovak territory and to overthrow the collaborationist government of Jozef Tiso. Although the resistance was largely defeated by German forces, guerrilla operations continued until the Red Army, Czechoslovak Army and Romanian Army occupied the Slovak Republic in 1945.

In the post-war period, many political entities, mainly the Communists, attempted to "hijack" the uprising to their credit. The Communist regime in Czechoslovakia presented the Uprising as an event initiated and governed by Communist forces. Some Slovak nationalists, on the other hand, claim that the uprising was a plot against the Slovak nation, as one of its main objectives was to oust the regime of the puppet Slovak state and reestablish Czechoslovakia. In fact, many factions fought in the uprising, the largest of which were units of the Slovak Army, Democratic resistance, Communist partisans, and international forces. Given this fractionalization, the Uprising did not have unambiguous popular support. Yet the participants and supporters of the Uprising represented every religion, class, age, and anti-Nazi political fraction of the Slovak nation.

Preliminaries

Edvard Beneš, leader of the Czechoslovak government in exile in London, initiated preparations for a possible revolt in 1943 when he contacted dissident elements of the Slovak Army. In December 1943, various groups that would be involved in the uprising—the government in exile, Czechoslovak democrats and Communists, and the Slovak army—formed the underground , and signed the so-called "Christmas Treaty", a joint declaration to recognize Beneš' authority and to recreate Czechoslovakia after the war. The council was responsible for creating the preparatory phase of the uprising.

In March 1944, Slovak army Lieutenant Colonel Ján Golian took charge of the preparations. Conspirators stockpiled money, ammunition and other supplies in military bases in central and eastern Slovakia. Approximately 3,200 Slovak soldiers deserted and joined partisan groups or the Soviet Army. In April 1944, Slovak Jews Rudolf Vrba and Alfred Wetzler escaped from Auschwitz and published a detailed report about the operation of the gas chambers at Auschwitz.

In summer 1944, the partisans intensified their war against German occupation forces, mainly in the mountains of north-central Slovakia. In July, Soviet troops in Poland began to advance towards Slovakia. By August 1944, Soviet troops were at Krosno, Poland, within  of the northeastern Slovak border.

Two heavily armed divisions of the Slovak Army, together with the entire eastern Slovak Air Force, were deliberately relocated to Prešov in north-eastern Slovakia in the summer of 1944 to execute one of two planned options to begin the uprising. The two options were:

 Capture Dukla Pass (joining Poland and Slovakia through the Carpathian Mountains) when the Soviet (1st Ukrainian Front under Marshal Ivan Konev) arrived.
 As ordered by Golian, capture Dukla Pass immediately and hold the pass against any German forces until the Soviet Army could arrive.

Colonel  was the chief of staff of the two divisions. He had agreed in advance with the resistance army leadership and the uprising planning committee of the Slovak National Council to execute either of these two plans, depending on the circumstances. On 23 August 1944, Romania, initially Slovakia's ally, changed sides in favor of the Allies. On 28 August 1944 in Martin, a group of Communist partisans under Soviet direction killed 24 German soldiers returning from Romania. The next day, German troops began to occupy Slovakia to put down the uprising. German arrangements for the occupation were completed a few weeks earlier.

At 19:00 hours on 29 August 1944, Slovak Defence Minister General Ferdinand Čatloš announced on state radio that Germany had occupied Slovakia. At 20:00, Golian sent the coded message to all units to begin the uprising. But instead of adhering to the agreed plan, on 30 August Colonel Talský and the entire eastern Slovak Air Force flew to a prearranged landing zone in Poland to join the Soviet Army, and abandoned the two divisions at Prešov. The two divisions, left in chaos and without leadership, were quickly disarmed on the afternoon of 30 August without a single shot. Consequently, the uprising commenced prematurely and lost a crucial component of their plan, as well as the two most heavily armed divisions.

Forces

Accounts of the exact numbers of combatants vary. At first, the resistance Slovak partisan forces consisted of an estimated 18,000 soldiers. The total increased to 47,000 after mobilization on 9 September 1944, and later to 60,000, plus 18,000 partisans from over 30 countries. The Slovak Resistance Air Force had a small number of mostly obsolete planes.

In addition to Slovak forces, the combatants included various other groups: escaped French prisoners of war, Soviet partisans, and Special Operations Executive (SOE) and Office of Strategic Services (OSS) operatives. The Slovak side had to use mostly biplanes and improvised armored trains to fight against the better equipped German weapons. In addition to Soviet aid, United States B-17 Flying Fortress bombers assigned to 483rd BG, escorted by North American P-51B Mustang's landed at Tri Duby airfield near Banská Bystrica on 4 October 1944 (2 x aircraft) as well as 7 October 1944 (6 x aircraft) and brought supplies and three OSS teams, headed by a naval officer, Lieutenant James Holt Green. They also took out 18 Allied pilots shot down over Slovakia and five French partisans.

After the uprising started, Czechoslovak officials in exile discussed the possibility of bringing in Czechoslovak units deployed on the Eastern Front with the Soviet Army. Two such units were brought in. On 15–17 September 1944, the  landed at  airfield near Zvolen with 21 Lavochkin La-5 fighters.

Course of the uprising

Uprising begins

Rebels began the uprising on 29 August at 8:00 p.m. under the command of Ján Golian. They entered Banská Bystrica in the morning of 30 August and made it their headquarters. German troops disarmed the Eastern Slovak Army on 31 August. Many of the soldiers were sent to camps in Germany while others escaped and joined the Soviet-controlled partisans or returned home. On 5 September Ján Golian became the commander of all the rebel forces in Slovakia and was given the rank of General. Slovak forces in central Slovakia mobilized 47,000 men. His first analysis of the situation predicted that the resistance army could resist German attacks for about two weeks.

Guards at the three main labor camps, Sereď, Nováky, and Vyhne, fled at the beginning of the uprising and most Jewish prisoners left. About 1,600 to 2,000 Jews fought as partisans, ten percent of the total resistance force. Fifteen percent of Jewish partisans were killed. Many Jewish partisans hid their religious affiliation due to antisemitism in the partisan movement.

By 10 September the resistance army had gained control of large areas of central and eastern Slovakia, including two airfields, which were used by the Soviet Air Force to fly in equipment.

Momentum lost

The pro-German government of Tiso remained in power in Bratislava. Germany moved 40,000 SS soldiers under Gottlob Berger to suppress the uprising, which detained and disarmed two Slovak divisions and 20,000 soldiers that had been supposed to secure the mountain passes to help the Red Army. Beneš had met with Stalin and Molotov in Moscow in December 1943 to secure Soviet support for the uprising, but Soviet premier Joseph Stalin and the Soviet military command Stavka failed to deliver the needed support on time to the resistance army and even blocked Western offers of military aid, as they had done only a few weeks earlier during the Warsaw uprising. Meanwhile, General Konev and the Soviet partisan headquarters in Kiev, Ukraine, continued to undermine the Slovak resistance army by ordering partisan groups operating in forward positions in Slovakia to conduct operations independently of the Slovak resistance army and avoid coordination. The Soviet-led partisans even demanded and took desperately needed weapons and munitions that had been stored for the Slovak uprising. The vast majority of Soviet airdrops of weapons over resistance-held territory in Eastern and Northern Slovakia were quickly confiscated by Soviet partisans and little ended up in the hands of the much stronger and better trained Slovak resistance army.

On 8 September, the Red Army began an offensive on the Dukla Pass on the Slovak-Polish border and tried to fight through the Carpathian Mountains to penetrate into Slovakia. This poorly planned and late action resulted in tremendous casualties on both sides and became bogged down for nearly two months.

Beneš, the Soviet partisans, and various Slovak factions began to argue among themselves, each seeking operational control. Despite repeated efforts, General Golian could not persuade the different sides to coordinate their efforts. General Rudolf Viest flew in and took command on 7 October, with Golian becoming his second-in-command. Viest could not control the situation when political rivalries resurfaced in the face of military failure.

The uprising also coincided with the stalling of the Soviet summer offensive, the failure of the Warsaw Uprising, and other troubles on the side of the Western allies. The Red Army and its Czechoslovak allies failed to quickly penetrate the Dukla Pass despite fierce fighting between 8 September and 28 October; they suffered 85,000 casualties (21,000 dead). The Czechoslovak government in exile failed to convince Western allies to ignore Stalin's obstructionism and send more supplies to the area.

On 17 September two B-17 Flying Fortresses flew in the OSS mission of Lieutenant James Holt-Green. The SOE team of Major John Sehmer followed the next day on its way to Hungary. Their reports confirmed the suspicions of Western Allies that the situation of the uprising was worsening.

Counteroffensive

On 19 September, German command replaced SS-Obergruppenführer Berger, who had been in charge of the troops fighting the Uprising, with General Höfle. By that time Germans had 48,000 soldiers; they consisted of eight German divisions, including four from the Waffen-SS and one pro-Nazi Slovak formation.
 

A major German counteroffensive began on 17–18 October when 35,000 German troops entered the country from Hungary, which had been under German military occupation since 19 March 1944. Stalin demanded that his advancing Second Ukrainian Front led by General Malinovsky be immediately diverted from Eastern Slovakia to Budapest. The western advance of Soviet forces came to a sudden halt in late October 1944, when Stalin's interests focused on Hungary, Austria and Poland rather than Slovakia or the Czech lands. By the end of October, Axis forces (six German divisions and one pro-Nazi Slovak unit) had taken back most of the territory from the insurgents and encircled the fighting groups. Battles cost at least 10,000 casualties on both sides.

The resistance army had to evacuate Banská Bystrica on 27 October just prior to the German takeover. SOE and OSS agents retreated to the mountains alongside the thousands of others fleeing the German advance. The rebels prepared to change their strategy to that of guerrilla warfare. On 28 October, Viest sent London a message that said the organized resistance had ended. On 30 October, General Höfle and President Tiso celebrated in Banská Bystrica and awarded medals to German soldiers for their part in the suppression of the uprising.

The main OSS team, along with two British officers and a soldier, a Czech officer, two American civilians and war correspondent Joseph Morton were cornered near the village of Polomka by Christmas 1944, under heavy winter conditions, and captured on 26 December by a 300-man strong German SS anti-partisan unit. All of them were taken to Mauthausen concentration camp, where the agents and soldiers were executed in January 1945. Morton's life was not spared, and he was also shot to death on 24 January 1945.

Aftermath

Nonetheless, partisans and the remains of the regular forces continued their efforts in the mountains. In retaliation, Einsatzgruppe H and the Hlinka Guard Emergency Divisions executed many Slovaks suspected of aiding the rebels as well as Jews who had avoided deportation until then, and destroyed 93 villages on suspicion of collaboration. Several villages were burned to the ground and all their inhabitants were murdered, as in Ostrý Grúň and Kľak (21 January 1945) or Kalište (18 March 1945). A later estimate of the death toll was 5,304 and authorities discovered 211 mass graves that resulted from those atrocities. The largest executions occurred in Kremnička (747 killed, mostly Jews and Roma) and Nemecká (900 killed).

On 3 November, the Germans captured Golian and Viest in Pohronský Bukovec; they later interrogated and executed them.

The German victory only postponed the eventual downfall of the pro-Nazi regime. Six months later, the Red Army had overrun Axis troops in Czechoslovakia. By December 1944 Romanian and Soviet troops had driven German troops out of southern Slovakia in the Battle of Budapest. On 19 January 1945, the Red Army took Bardejov, Svidník, Prešov and Košice in Eastern Slovakia. On 3–5 March they had taken over northwest Slovakia. On 25 March they entered Banská Bystrica and on 4 April marched into Bratislava.

The main military objectives were not achieved due to the bad timing of the uprising and lack of cooperation by Soviet partisans. This undermined the plans of the resistance Slovak army. The guerrilla struggle, however, tied up significant German forces that could otherwise have reinforced the Wehrmacht on the eastern front against the advancing 1st Ukrainian Front to the north and south of Slovakia. Nevertheless, much of Slovakia was left devastated by the Uprising and the German counter-offensive and occupation.

In public discourse

In Czechoslovakia and in particular in its Slovak part the SNP was celebrated as working peoples taking to arms against fascist dictatorship in the name of freedom, progress and justice. Many streets and institutions were named after SNP or heroes of the SNP (also in the Czech part), every year solemn official ceremonies were held on the anniversary of the outbreak of the rising and the press extensively dwelled on the heroic fight of the Slovak insurgents. In 1951 the day of August 29 was declared a public holiday. In 1955 Múzeum Slovenského Národného Povstania was opened in Banska Bystrica and official programs ensured a constant inflow of visitors from schools and workplaces. Monuments, plaques, commemorative stones and other objects honoring the SNP were constructed across all of the Slovak part of Czechoslovakia. 

The fall of Communist regime in 1989 triggered public debate on SNP, which became particularly heated after Slovakia became independent in 1993. A wide array of opinions were presented on various issues related to the rising, like its cause, objectives, opponents, mechanism, international background, impact and role in the Slovak history; at least three distinct visions of the SNP were floated.

 First episode in the process of foreign takeover of Slovakia. In the most popular version, this perspective was advanced with relation to the USSR. SNP was presented as beginning of the Communist dictatorship, with focus on Soviet-related political groupings behind the rising and their subordinate partisan units. Within technically broad political coalition behind the rising, reportedly soon the Communists started to dominate and embarked on marginalisation of other currents. In the post-war era the memory of SNP was vital within the Communist propaganda toolset. In the less popular version, this perspective was advanced with relation to Czechoslovakism. Both the London government and the Moscow-sponsored Slovak Communists engineered the rising in order to build a common Czechoslovak state, in practice to be run by the Czechs, and none of the documents, produced by SNP leaders, referred to an independent Slovakia. Proponents of both versions agreed that SNP was neither Slovak nor national nor even a rising, and some claimed that in fact, it was anti-Slovak, and its result was humiliation of the entire nation.  

 Civil war. Within this perspective both the Slovak state and the resistance represented genuine sentiments of two significant parts of the nation. Outbreak of the rising marked the fratricidal war and was above all a great national tragedy. At times it might be noted that foreign powers – e.g. Germany and the USSR - were greatly responsible for the bloodshed, which otherwise could have been avoided. Some tend to view SNP as a war fought by totalitarian powers of the Nazis and the Soviets by their Slovak proxies. Allegedly genuine and spontaneous character of the rising might have been questioned by noting that insurgent troops were to a large extent made of regular Slovak army units, composed of conscripts. There were comments about increasingly bewildered rank-and-file resistance, who thought they would fight the Germans but found themselves fighting Slovak statehood. Some even noted that there were resistance members who rose to arms intending to defend the Slovak state and personally Tiso, as the Germans were supposedly about to arrest him. Finally, supporters of the civil war perspective were relatively most likely to note atrocities, committed by both sides. 

 National anti-fascist rising in name of democracy and liberty. The rising was presented as backed by overwhelming majority of the population; by the same token, the Slovak state was described as a puppet regime deprived of genuine support and existent thanks to Nazi support and massive terror. The resistance was reportedly related to a broad array of political currents, from Communists to nationalists to supporters of the exiled London government. Emphasis might have been either on fighting fascism and dictatorship (most popular option), or the Germans (also popular) or the Tiso regime (relatively unfrequent). In the prevailing narrative the insurgents stood for democracy and liberty; not rarely the rising was associated also with social justice and at times even presented in somewhat revolutionary terms. It was associated with the Slovak national movement up to the point of declaring it the most important event in the 1000 years of Slovak history, the most manifest demonstration of the Slovak claim for nationhood and sovereignty, but also as Slovak credentials to become members of free, democratic Europe. 

Most threads converged in discussion whether SNP should be officially honoured by the Slovak state, which climaxed in the mid- and late 1990s. Supporters of this option have relatively easily gained advantage in public discourse, even though the conflict between the Slovak Republic tradition and the SNP tradition has not been satisfactorily resolved in the popular narrative. August 29 remained as public holiday, most street names have been retained, while monuments are being well maintained and taken care of. Cases of dropping SNP references were related to commercial changes rather than to politics, e.g. in case of the aluminium giant Slovalco. The rising went on as part of the official memory. Moreover, it is viewed as key episode of national history by most of the population. In the popular survey of 2018, when asked to name the most important event during last 100 years, most Slovaks pointed to SNP over emergence of the Slovak state in 1993 (second) and the Velvet revolution of 1989 (third). There is no particular individual symbolic for SNP, and persons at times listed as its leaders, like Rudolf Viest or Ján Golian, have not made it to top 10 greatest Slovaks in history.

References

Sources

Further reading

External links

Slovak National Uprising Museum in Banská Bystrica
Czechoslovak military units in USSR (1942–1945)
Slovak National Uprising Anniversary website
 (Czech)

 
20th-century rebellions
1944 in Slovakia
Slovakia during World War II
Conflicts in 1944
Eastern European World War II resistance movements
Military history of Slovakia during World War II
Uprisings during World War II
Eastern European theatre of World War II
World War II resistance movements
Battles and operations of World War II involving Germany
Battles and operations of World War II involving Czechoslovakia
August 1944 events
September 1944 events
October 1944 events
Battles and operations of World War II involving Hungary
Slovak independence movement